Dobrich, Haskovo Province is a village in the municipality of Dimitrovgrad, in Haskovo Province, in southern Bulgaria. It is located 7 kilometers east of Dimitrovgrad. The mayor of the village is Marin Marinov.

There is a Monastery of the Assumption near Dobrich. The holiday of the village is on 15 August and 28 August, the Days of the Assumption (new and old style).

References

Villages in Haskovo Province